Momodou Ceesay (born 24 December 1988) is a Gambian football striker who last played for Kazakh club Kyzylzhar and the Gambia national football team. He is featured on the Gambian national team in the official 2010 FIFA World Cup video game.

Club career
Ceesay started his football career playing for his home town club of Kanifing United. Ceesay came to Žilina in summer 2010 signing half-year contract and he scored in his first the Corgoň Liga match on 31 July 2010. He expressively helped to promotion of Žilina to the 2010–11 UEFA Champions League, scoring three goals in the qualifying rounds.

Ceesay left Kairat Almaty on 7 July 2015, after his contract was terminated by mutual consent. In September 2015 he signed for Maccabi Netanya

On 28 June 2018, Kyzylzhar announced the signing of Ceesay.

On 18 June 2019, Ceesay was released by Irtysh Pavlodar, returning to Kyzylzhar in July 2019.

Personal life
Ceesay's younger brother, Ali, was also a professional footballer. He last played for Skonto Rīga in the Latvian Higher League in 2014.

International
Ceesay made his senior national team debut against Mexico on 30 May 2010. In his second international match he scored his first goal for Gambia against Namibia on 4 September 2010.

International goals
Scores and results list Gambia's goal tally first.

Honours

Club
MŠK Žilina
Slovak First League:
Winner: 2011–12
Slovak Cup:
Winner: 2011–12
Runner-up: 2010–11

Kairat
Kazakhstan Cup:
Winner: 2014

International
African U-17 Championship: Winner 2005

References

External links

Momodou Ceesay at Footballdatabase

1988 births
Living people
Sportspeople from Banjul
Gambian footballers
Association football forwards
K.V.C. Westerlo players
FC Kairat players
Maccabi Netanya F.C. players
MŠK Žilina players
Kemi City F.C. players
FC Kyzylzhar players
FC Irtysh Pavlodar players
Belgian Pro League players
Slovak Super Liga players
Israeli Premier League players
Kazakhstan Premier League players
Veikkausliiga players
The Gambia youth international footballers
The Gambia international footballers
Gambian expatriate footballers
Gambian expatriate sportspeople in Belgium
Expatriate footballers in Belgium
Gambian expatriate sportspeople in Slovakia
Expatriate footballers in Slovakia
Gambian expatriate sportspeople in Kazakhstan
Expatriate footballers in Kazakhstan
Gambian expatriate sportspeople in Israel
Expatriate footballers in Israel
Gambian expatriate sportspeople in Finland
Expatriate footballers in Finland